Dr. Ray Braswell High School is a senior high school in unincorporated Denton County, south of Aubrey. It is a part of the Denton Independent School District.

Areas in its attendance boundary includes the census-designated places of Paloma Creek, Paloma Creek South, and Savannah. It also includes portions of Aubrey, Cross Roads, Little Elm, Oak Point, and Providence Village. It serves the area of the former Lincoln Park, and Cross Oak Ranch.

It is the district's easternmost high school.

History
Dr. Leslie Guajardo was selected as the school's first principal. It was the fourth comprehensive high school to be built in Denton ISD. It opened in fall 2016. The Denton Independent School District has named DeCorian Haliey principal for the 2020–2021 school year.

References

External links
 Braswell High School

Denton Independent School District high schools
Educational institutions established in 2016
2016 establishments in Texas